The men's +100 kilograms (heavyweight) competition at the 2010 Asian Games in Guangzhou was held on 13 November at the Huagong Gymnasium.

Kim Soo-whan of South Korea won the gold medal.

Schedule
All times are China Standard Time (UTC+08:00)

Results

Main bracket

Repechage

References

Results

External links
Draw

M101
Judo at the Asian Games Men's Heavyweight